The 1906 ECAHA season was the inaugural season of the Eastern Canada Amateur Hockey Association (ECAHA). Six teams played a 10-game schedule. The Ottawa HC and Montreal Wanderers tied for the league championship with a record of 9–1, while the Montreal Shamrocks didn't win a single game. The Senators and the Wanderers then played a two-game playoff for the league championship and the Stanley Cup, and the Wanderers won 9–1,3–9 (12–10) on goals.

League business

Executive 
Initial:

 Howard Wilson, Montreal (President)
 G. P. Murphy, Ottawa (1st Vice-President)
 Dr. Cameron (2nd Vice-President)
 James Strachan, Wanderers (Secretary-Treasurer)

After December 20:
 Howard Wilson, Montreal (President)
 William Northey, Montreal Arena Corp. (Secretary-Treasurer)

Rule Changes 

 Teams must appoint game timers for each game,
 a two referee system was adopted,
 new Arena Trophy would be awarded to the regular season winner,
 three-quarters vote would be needed to admit new teams,
 if a team resigns, all of its played games would be considered cancelled,
 $25 fine for delay of start of game, and
 $50 charge to make a protest, non-refundable.

Regular season 

The Ottawas played two Cup challenges during the regular season, defeating Queen's College of Kingston, the OHA champion, and defeating Smiths Falls, the FAHL champion.

Highlights 

This season saw many new players. Wanderers brought in Lester Patrick, Ernie Johnson and Ernie Russell and Ottawa brought in Harry and Tommy Smith.

Fred Brophy, of Montreal HC, repeated his goal-scoring performance from the goaltender position in a game against Montreal Victorias on March 7.

Again, the league was high scoring, with Harry Smith scoring 31 goals in 8 games, Russell Bowie scoring 30 goals in 9 games, and Frank McGee scoring 28 goals in 7 games. Mr. Smith scored 6 in one game, 5 in another, topped by 8 against the Shamrocks on February 17. Mr. McGee would equal the 8 goals in a game feat against Montreal HC on March 3. Seven players scored at least 5 goals in a single game.

Final standing 

Playoff qualifiers in bold.

Playoffs

Stanley Cup challenges 
The Ottawas played two Cup challenges during the regular season, defeating Queen's College of Kingston, the OHA champion, and defeating Smiths Falls, the FAHL champion.

Queen's University vs. Ottawa Hockey Club Silver Sevens 

 Spare - Queens University - B. Sutherland -C
 Spares - Ottawa - Hamilton "Billy" Gilmour -RW, Tommy Smith -C, "Coo" Dion -F, Jack Ebbs -F.

 Spare - Queens University - V.W. Crawford -C
 Spares - Ottawa - Hamilton "Billy" Gilmour -RW, Tommy Smith -C, "Coo" Dion -F, Jack Ebbs -F.
The lopsided score of the first game gave indications that the series would be quickly over. One interesting emergence was that of Marty Walsh. Walsh would help hold Ottawa to a 5–3 lead scoring two goals. In the game's second half, Ottawa broke away after the score was made 5–4 with nine unanswered goals. Ottawa would win game one by a score of 16–7. The game featured many multiple goal scorers; Westwick, McGee, A. Smith and H Smith would all score four goals for the Senators, and Richardson, Dobbson, and Walsh would each score two for Queen's.

Smiths Falls vs. Ottawa 

 Spares - Smith Falls - Unknown
 Spares - Ottawa - Hamilton "Billy" Gilmour -RW, Tommy Smith -C, "Coo" Dion -F, Jack Ebbs -F.

 Spares - Smith Falls - Unknown
 Spares - Ottawa - Hamilton "Billy" Gilmour -RW, Tommy Smith -C, "Coo" Dion -F, Jack Ebbs -F.

ECAHA Playoff 

As the season produced a tie for the season championship, the defending champion Ottawas and Wanderers played a two-game playoff, with the winner being awarded the Stanley Cup. The series took place on March 14 in Montreal and March 17 in Ottawa. The Wanderers would win the series 9–1, 3–9 (12–10) in dramatic fashion..

Game one
Ottawa was installed as 2–1 betting favourites, but the Wanderers upset the bookies. In the first game in Montreal, the Wanderers dominated Ottawa, as Ernie Russell got four goals, Frank Glass got three and Moose Johnson would get two for a 9–1 victory.

Game two

After the first game, the Ottawas would replace their goalie Billy Hague with the Smiths Falls goalie Percy LeSueur in to play his first game for the club. Despite being down by eight goals, interest in Ottawa for the return match was high. Rush seats on sale the day of the game produced a throng that caused the ticket seller's glass to break. The venue, Dey's Arena, was modified to hold more spectators, including setting up temporary bleachers, removing the grandstand which had been used as a press box, and the installation of a press box attached to the rafters. Over 5,400 would attend the game and the top $2 tickets were being sold for $10. Betting interest was high, including one $12,000 bet.

After twelve minutes, the first goal was scored by the Wanderers' Moose Johnson to increase the goal lead to nine. Ottawa's Frank McGee, Harry Smith, and McGee again scored before half-time, cutting the deficit to 10–4. Harry Smith would score to open the second half, followed by Rat Westwick. Then Westwick scored again to make it 10–7 before Harry Smith scored three straight goals to make the score 9–1, evening the series with ten minutes to play to tie the series, causing a five-minute standing ovation. With seven minutes to play Smith was sent off for the rest of the game and Lester Patrick would score with ninety seconds to play to put the Wanderers back in the lead. Patrick would ice the game with a goal with a few seconds to play. The Silver Seven reign was over.

The Toronto Globe called it the "greatest game of hockey ever played on Canadian ice, or any other." The Sporting News would later dub it the "Greatest Hockey Game in History." Moose Johnson would end up with the Governor-General's top hat. It had been knocked off of the Earl Grey's head, and a fan had snatched it up, giving it to Johnson later in the dressing room.

 Spares - Montreal Wanderers - Josh Arnold -RW, Cecil Blachford -RW injured-playing Coach,
 Spares - Ottawa - Hamilton "Billy" Gilmour -RW, Tommy Smith -C, "Coo" Dion -F, Jack Ebbs -F.

 Spares - Montreal Wanderers - Josh Arnold -RW, Cecil Blachford -RW injured-playing Coach
 Spares - Ottawa - Billy Hague -G, Hamilton "Billy" Gilmour -RW, Tommy Smith -C, "Coo" Dion -F, Jack Ebbs -F.

Because of the need for the play-off, no challenges were made against western teams until the following winter. Ottawa had won Stanley Cup challenges that season, which meant that the 1906 season would have two Stanley Cup holders: Ottawa until March, and Montreal Wanderers for the balance of the year.

Schedule and results

Player statistics

Goaltending averages 
Note: GP = Games played, GA = Goals against, SO = Shutouts, GAA = Goals against average

Leading scorers

Stanley Cup engravings 

The 1906 Stanley Cup was presented twice by the trophy's trustee William Foran.

1906 Ottawa Hockey Club

The following Ottawa Hockey Club players and staff are members of Stanley Cup winning team.

1906 Montreal Wanderers

The following Wanderers players and staff are members of the Stanley Cup winning team.

See also 
 1905–06 Ottawa Hockey Club season
 Eastern Canadian Amateur Hockey Association
 List of pre-NHL seasons
 List of ice hockey leagues
 List of Stanley Cup champions

References 
 
 
 
 

Notes

ECAHA
Eastern Canada Amateur Hockey Association seasons